Hassanat Taiwo Akinwande , the stage name Wunmi, is a well-known Nigerian film and television actress. She is of Yoruba ethnicity.

Her career began in the 1980s with appearances in the soap opera Feyi Kogbon. She has had leading roles in over 50 videos.

In 2006 she was arrested for possession of cocaine. The publicity surrounding her arrest boosted the popularity of her videos.!

References

20th-century Nigerian actresses
Year of birth missing (living people)
Living people
Yoruba actresses
Actresses in Yoruba cinema